Carlos Chacana (born 23 June 1976 in San Miguel de Tucumán) is an Argentine-Israeli professional football (soccer) player who is currently contracted to Agudat HaMakhtesh.

Biography

Early life 
Carlos Chacana was raised in Tucumán Province in Argentina by his mother and grandfather, after his father left when he was a child. He says that after every goal he scores, he says a prayer for his grandfather. Chacana began to play football in his neighborhood and local tournaments. He was scared at first about playing actual club football though because he did not have enough money for shoes.

Playing career

Start in Argentina 
At the age of 16, Chacana began training with Club Atlético San Martín de Tucumán after being pressured to by his grandfather. The club supplied Chacana with a pair of football boots and occasionally with transportation to training. In 1997, he played his first professional match for San Martín in a Primera B Nacional match. Slowly, he cracked the first team and started to score goals. During a league match against Club Atlético Tucumán, officials from River Plate were impressed by his play. The next day Chacana found himself on a bus to Buenos Aires.

The players at River Plate gave him the nickname, "El Burrito de Tucumán" because of the resemblance between him and Ariel Ortega. Because Chacana entered though in midseason, he could only take part in Copa Libertadores matches. At the end of the season, Ramón Díaz was appointed manager and Chacana left for Quilmes.

Kuwait
After a short time at Quilmes, Chacana made his first departure to the Middle East. His time at Al Arabi was cut short due to the Iraq War.

Israel
In 2003, he arrived at Liga Artzit side Hapoel Nazareth Illit. Club officials told him that since his wife, Priscila Radusky, is Jewish, he would receive special benefits as a new immigrant under the Law of Return. Originally, Chacana was not interested in immigrating, but was later convinced. After just one season, he was released by Nazareth Illit. He returned to San Martín de Tucumán but felt that he needed to return to Israel in order to prove people wrong. Israeli agent, Gilad Katsav, arranged for him to join Hapoel Ashkelon where he became an instant success and fan favorite. He was given a new nickname in Ashkelon, "El Loco Lindo" and achieved celebrity in the city. During his season at Ashkelon, the club reached the semi-final of the Israel State Cup and gained promotion to the Liga Leumit

After a short term at Hapoel Kfar Saba, Chacana left for Ironi Kiryat Shmona. When the season ended, Chacana signed a US $50,000 contract with Hapoel Ramat Gan of the Liga Leumit, despite having an offer from F.C. Ashdod in the Israeli Premier League. The primary reason for Chacana's signing with Ramat Gan, was because a fan of the club was willing to pay for the entire treatment of his sons bout with leukemia.

When his contract ended with Hapoel Ramat Gan, he had an unsuccessful trial with Maccabi Petah Tikva. Though having more offers from Israeli clubs, Chacana signed a new one-year deal with Slovenian side, NK MIK CM Celje. During his debut match against NK Maribor, he scored his team's second goal in a 3:3 draw. His family remained in Israel though, where his son underwent further treatments at Sheba Medical Center.

Honours

Club 
 With Hapoel Ashkelon:
 Liga Artzit: 2004–05
 Toto Cup Artzit: 2004–05
 With Hapoel Ramat Gan:
 Liga Artzit: 2006–07
 Toto Cup Artzit: 2006–07
 Liga Leumit: 2011–12
 Toto Cup Leumit: 2011
 Israel State Cup: 2013
 With Al-Arabi SC:
 GCC Champions League: 2003

Individual
 Liga Artzit Leading Scorer: 2004–05

Footnotes

External links
 Carlos Chacana at BDFA.com.ar 
 Stats at Prva-Liga

1976 births
Living people
Argentine footballers
Israeli footballers
Jewish Argentine sportspeople
San Martín de Tucumán footballers
Club Atlético River Plate footballers
Quilmes Atlético Club footballers
Al-Arabi SC (Kuwait) players
Expatriate footballers in Kuwait
Hapoel Nof HaGalil F.C. players
Hapoel Ashkelon F.C. players
Hapoel Kfar Saba F.C. players
NK Celje players
Hapoel Ramat Gan F.C. players
Hapoel Kfar Shalem F.C. players
F.C. Ironi Or Yehuda players
Hapoel Kiryat Ono F.C. players
Sportspeople from San Miguel de Tucumán
Liga Leumit players
Israeli Premier League players
Argentine expatriate footballers
Expatriate footballers in Slovenia
Argentine emigrants to Israel
Association football wingers
Argentine expatriate sportspeople in Kuwait
Kuwait Premier League players